Acrocercops leucocyma, also known as the kauri leafminer, is a species of moth in the family Gracillariidae. It is endemic to New Zealand.

Taxonomy 

This species was described by Edward Meyrick in 1889 using a specimen he collected in the Waitakere Range in Auckland and named Gracilaria leucocyma. George Hudson discussed this species under the name Parectopa laucocyma in his 1928 publication The Butterflies and Moths of New Zealand. The specimen collected by Meyrick was the only recorded specimen until this species was rediscovered in 1954 by K. A. J. Wise. In 1961 Lajos Vári restricted the genus Parectopa to Holarctic species which do not have genital characteristics that resemble New Zealand species. As a result, John S. Dugdale placed this species in the genus Acrocercops. However the genus level classification of Acrocercops leucocyma is regarded as unsatisfactory and as such the species is currently also known as Acrocercops (s.l.) leucocyma. The holotype specimen is held at the Natural History Museum, London.

Description 
Meyrick described this species as follows:

Distribution 
This species is endemic to New Zealand.

Biology and life cycle 
The adult moths of this species are on the wing in spring and summer.

Habitat and host species 

The larvae feed on Agathis australis. They mine the leaves of their host plant. The mine starts at the tip of the leaf and then heads for the general direction of the petiole, sometimes double-backing along the way. Near the petiole, the host plant forms a gall, creating a sheltered site for the larva to overwinter. After hibernation, the larva chews itself out of the gall and pupates on the leaf in a parchment-like cocoon.

References

Gracillariinae
Moths of New Zealand
Endemic fauna of New Zealand
Taxa named by Edward Meyrick
Moths described in 1889
Endemic moths of New Zealand